Halfpenny, half penny, or ha'penny may refer to:

Coins
 Halfpenny (British decimal coin) 
 Halfpenny (British pre-decimal coin)
 Halfpenny (Irish pre-decimal coin)
 Halfpenny (Irish decimal coin)
 Halfpenny (Australian) (pre-decimal)
 New Zealand half penny coin (pre-decimal)
 The St. Patrick halfpenny, 17th century
 Scottish halfpenny coin, pre-Union
 Half cent (United States coin)

Other uses
 Halfpenny (surname)
 Ha'penny (novel), by Jo Walton
 Ha'penny Bridge, over the Liffey in Dublin
 Halfpenny Bridge, over the Thames in Lechlade, Gloucestershire, England
 Halfpenny Gate, village in County Down, Northern Ireland
 Halfpenny Rose Red, a postage stamp from the reign of Queen Victoria
 Halfpenny, Cumbria, hamlet in Southern Lakeland, Cumbria, England

See also

 Bord halfpenny,  a fee paid in markets and fairs by the Saxons to the lord
 Shove ha'penny, a pub game
 "Half-Penny, Two-Penny", 1981 song by Styx